No Nuclear War is the seventh and final studio album by Peter Tosh.  It was released on September 21, 1987, ten days after Tosh's murder. It received a Grammy Award for Best Reggae Album in 1988. It was Tosh's second Grammy nomination, Captured Live having been nominated in the same category in 1985.

Track listing

Personnel
 Peter Tosh – lead vocals, rhythm guitar, keyboards, backing vocals, horn arrangements
 Daniel “Danny AxeMan” Thompson , George "Fully" Fulwood, Leebert "Gibby" Morrison – bass guitar
 Carlton "Santa" Davis – drums
 Steve Golding – rhythm guitar 
 Keith Sterling, Tyrone Downie – keyboards
 Scully Sims, Uziah Thompson – percussion
 David Madden, Dean Fraser, Junior "Chico" Chin, Ronald "Nambo" Robinson – horns
 Cynthia Schloss, June Lodge, Nadine Sutherland, Pam Hall, Ruddy Thomas – backing vocals

Technical
 Dennis Thompson, Peter Tosh – mixing
 Neville Garrick – cover illustration
 Adrian Boot – photography.

References

Peter Tosh albums
1987 albums
EMI Records albums
Grammy Award for Best Reggae Album